Agnes Maryna Samaria (born 11 August 1972 in Otjiwarongo) is a retired Namibian middle-distance runner who specialized in the 800 metres.

Samaria won two of the three medals that the country won at the 2007 All-Africa Games. She has been a UNICEF Goodwill Ambassador since 2005.

Competition record

Personal bests
400 metres - 53.83 s (2001)
800 metres - 1:59.15 min (2002)
1500 metres - 4:05.30 min (2008)
Mile run - 4:25.01 min (2007)

Namibian Sports Women of the Year (2002, 2003, 2004, 2005, 2006, 2007)

References

External links 
 
 

1972 births
Living people
Namibian female middle-distance runners
Athletes (track and field) at the 2004 Summer Olympics
Athletes (track and field) at the 2008 Summer Olympics
Olympic athletes of Namibia
Athletes (track and field) at the 2002 Commonwealth Games
Commonwealth Games bronze medallists for Namibia
Commonwealth Games medallists in athletics
World Athletics Championships athletes for Namibia
People from Otjiwarongo
UNICEF Goodwill Ambassadors
African Games silver medalists for Namibia
African Games medalists in athletics (track and field)
African Games bronze medalists for Namibia
Athletes (track and field) at the 1999 All-Africa Games
Athletes (track and field) at the 2007 All-Africa Games
20th-century Namibian women
21st-century Namibian women
Medallists at the 2002 Commonwealth Games